Émile Bollaert (13 November 1890 – 18 May 1978) was French High Commissioner of Indochina from 5 March 1947 to 19 October 1948.

He was one of the senators elected by the National Assembly who held office during  the French Fourth Republic.

References

People of French Indochina
French senators elected by the National Assembly
1890 births
1978 deaths
French military personnel of the First Indochina War